Destruction is a 1915 American silent drama film directed by Will S. Davis and starring Theda Bara. The film is now considered to be lost. Destruction is based on the 1901 Émile Zola novel Travail ("Labor").

Plot
Fernande a greedy woman, marries a rich old man who is expected to die soon to get all his money. The husband discover her intentions but he died suddenly before being able to change his will. Now a widow, her next plan is to kill the wealthy's man son who also inherits.

Cast
 Theda Bara as Fernade
 J. Herbert Frank as Dave Walker
 James A. Furey as John Froment
 Gaston Bell as John Froment II
 Warner Oland as Mr. Deleveau
 Esther Hoier as Josine Walker
 James Sheridan as Josine's Brother (as Master Tansey)
 Arthur Morrison as Lang
 Frank Evans as Mill Foreman
 Carleton Macy as Charles Froment
 Johnnie Walker (as J. Walker)

See also
List of lost films
1937 Fox vault fire

References

External links

lobby poster

1915 films
1915 drama films
1915 lost films
Silent American drama films
American silent feature films
American black-and-white films
Films based on works by Émile Zola
Films directed by Will S. Davis
Lost American films
Fox Film films
Lost drama films
1910s American films